June Mary Bronhill  (26 June 192924 January 2005), also known as June Gough, was an Australian coloratura soprano opera singer, performer and actress,
 
She was well known for light opera, operetta and musical theatre in London West End theatres and Australia as well as on the opera stage.

Biography
Born as June Mary Gough in Broken Hill, New South Wales, in 1929, the daughter of George Francis Gough (1892-1963), born in Essex, England, and Mary Isobel Daisy Gough (1895-1964), née Hall,

She married twice, first to Brian Martin at Marrickville, New South Wales, on 10 August 1951; and second, to Richard Milburne Champion de Crespigny Finny (1925-2003), in Sydney, on 17 January 1963. Both marriages ended in divorce. She had a daughter, Carolyn Jane Finny, in May 1963 by her second marriage.

Stage name
Like other noted Australian sopranos, such as  Elsie Mary Fischer (1881-1945) ("Elsa Stralia"),  Vera Honor Hempseed (1890-1952) ("Madame Vera Tasma", after Tasmania), Helen Porter Mitchell (1861-1931) ("Nellie Melba", after Melbourne), Dorothy Mabel Thomas (1896-1978) ("Dorothy Canberra"), Florence Ellen Towl (1870-1952) ("Madame Ballara", after Ballarat), and Florence Mary Wilson (1892-1968) ("Florence Austral"), June Mary Gough adopted the stage name ""June Bronhill" (after Broken Hill), which was her way of thanking her home town for its support in raising money to send her overseas for professional training as a singer. Her European vocal teacher misheard "Broken Hill" as "Bro-n-hill".

Career
She won third prize in the Sun Aria, now known as the Sydney Eisteddfod McDonald's Operatic Aria, in 1949 and first prize in 1950. She used her prize money to fund a trip to London to further her studies.

Bronhill trained in London and gained early exposure with the English National Opera (Sadler's Wells Opera) company in Mozart's The Marriage of Figaro. She also sang leading roles in Die Fledermaus, The Gypsy Baron, Menotti's The Telephone, Flotow's Martha and Hansel and Gretel. Her roles in Offenbach's operas, with the Sadler's Wells company, included Eurydice in Orpheus in the Underworld and Gabrielle in La Vie parisienne.

In 1961 and 1962, she appeared as Maria von Trapp in The Sound of Music on the Australian stage. In 1964 she appeared as Elizabeth in the musical Robert and Elizabeth at the Lyric Theatre, London alongside Keith Michell as Robert Browning, a show she took to Australia in 1966. She also appeared in England in tours of two Ivor Novello musicals, Glamorous Night and The Dancing Years, the latter playing a season at the Saville Theatre in London. She also appeared as the Mother Abbess in the 1981 London revival of Rodgers and Hammerstein's The Sound of Music at the Apollo Victoria Theatre.

Bronhill was perhaps best known for the title role of Hanna Glawari in Franz Lehár's The Merry Widow, with the Sadler's Wells Opera (now known as English National Opera), with Thomas Round as Danilo in 1958 and revised in 1960. She sang the role more than 200 times, capturing a faithful following.

Bronhill made frequent visits back to her homeland, singing in operas such as The Merry Widow, Orpheus in the Underworld, Die Fledermaus and Rigoletto at the Sydney Opera House in 1975. In 1976, she decided to move back to Australia permanently. In Australia she appeared in operas such as Il Seraglio (Die Entführung aus dem Serail) and a Victoria State Opera production of Donnizetti's Maria Stuarda in July 1976, directed by Robin Lovejoy with a cast including Nance Grant conducted by Richard Divall.

She played operetta roles such as Josephine (H.M.S. Pinafore), Phyllis (Iolanthe) and Ruth (The Pirates of Penzance). She also had roles in The Maid of the Mountains, Call Me Madam, A Little Night Music, Nunsense, My Fair Lady and How to Succeed in Business Without Really Trying as well as appearing in the non-musical plays Arsenic and Old Lace and Straight and Narrow.

Bronhill also appeared in the role of Mrs Crawford in the television comedy series Are You Being Served?, the Australian version of the British comedy series, as well as in Lipton Tea television advertisements singing an adaption of Fugue for Tinhorns.

Bronhill was a patron of the Australian Girls Choir from the choir's beginning. There is a scholarship in her name, the June Bronhill Encouragement Scholarship, awarded each year to the chorister with the most choral prowess.

A portrait of Bronhill, painted by Andrew Sibley, was entered into the 1966 Archibald Prize.

In 1976 she was awarded the Order of the British Empire for her contributions to the music industry. In Broken Hill a street and an auditorium are named after her.

Bronhill released her debut single, "The Lord's Prayer" in late 1979.
 
Her voice was characterised as a "very crystal clear, diamond bright coloratura soprano" with "absolutely impeccable diction". Opera News noted that "Bronhill's crisp, bright prettiness and crystalline diction made her an ideal exponent of operetta heroines."

Death
Bronhill died on 24 January 2005, aged 75, in her sleep at a Sydney nursing home. Although she had beaten breast cancer in the 1980s, her later years were marred by deafness and social isolation, and she retired in 1993. Her home town, Broken Hill, honoured her by declaring a minute's silence during the 2005 Australia Day celebrations two days after her death. Mayor Ron Page noted, "She is very special to us; if you ask every householder in Broken Hill, they'll be able to say, yes, they are proud of June Bronhill." Then acting prime Minister, John Anderson noted, "The world is mourning the loss of someone who entertained millions, but it's good to see the local community here recognise one of their own in ... a very proud community celebrating the life of one of their daughters."

Autobiography
Bronhill's "frank and funny" autobiography, The Merry Bronhill, was published in 1987. EMI Australia produced a compilation album with the same title to publicise the book.

Honours
Bronhill was made an Officer of the Order of the British Empire (OBE) in the New Year's Honours of 1976, and was later given a Lifetime Achievement Award by the Australian Variety Club.

References

Sources
 Operation on Singer, The Canberra Times, (Wednesday, 7 August 1968), p.8.
 Aust. Singer Better, The Sydney Morning Herald, (Wednesday, 7 August 1968), p.3.
 O'Connor, Patrick (1992), 'Bronhill, June' in The New Grove Dictionary of Opera, ed. Stanley Sadie (London)

External links
 
 News report of her death, and photograph
 June Bronhill in AusStage
 June Bronhill obituary
 June Bronhill – Britannica Online Encyclopedia
 June Bronhill – Hall of Fame
 June Bronhill dies  – Sydney Morning Herald
 June Bronhill – The Australian Women's Register
 Bronhill, June (singer) : programs and related material collected by the National Library of Australia

1929 births
2005 deaths
Australian operatic sopranos
Australian musical theatre actresses
Australian television actresses
Deaths from Alzheimer's disease
Deaths from dementia in Australia
Australian Officers of the Order of the British Empire
People from Broken Hill, New South Wales
20th-century Australian women opera singers
Australian people of English descent